Tracker is a family of business software products developed by Automation Centre. Each product includes applications for various business processes. While these products share a similar process framework, they differ in platform deployment.

Products
The Tracker family includes Tracker Suite, TrackerOffice, and TrackerSuite.Net. Tracker Suite and TrackerOffice are groupware, utilizing the Lotus Notes and Microsoft Outlook email systems, respectively.

TrackerSuite.Net is a web application, although it also utilizes email for functions such as notifications and reminders. It is considered a cloud computing application, as it can be configured to interact with software as a service solutions such as QuickBooks Online Edition. TrackerSuite.Net also integrates with email systems, including Lotus Notes and Microsoft Outlook.

Each Tracker product includes modular applications for typical business divisions including project management, information technology management, human resources and sales. However, the business modules available in each package differ. Similar applications also vary in terms of features offered. For example, the personnel management module in TrackerOffice does not offer as many functions and tools as the same module in Tracker Suite and TrackerSuite.Net.

See also
 Project management software
 List of project management software
 Help Desk
 Comparison of time tracking software
 Comparison of help desk issue tracking software

References 

 Stang, D. (2011, June 13). MarketScope for Project and Portfolio Management Applications. Gartner. Retrieved May 5, 2012, from http://www.gartner.com/id=1724626.
 Levine, R. (2011, February 26). TrackerSuite.Net 3.6 Review. Bright Hub. Retrieved March 8, 2011, from http://www.brighthub.com/office/project-management/reviews/108262.aspx.
 (2009, August 17). Products to Watch. eWeek. Retrieved August 21, 2009, from http://www.eweek-digital.com/eweek/20090817/?pg=45#pg45.
 Levine, R. (2009, July 30). Top 5 Project Management Cartoons. Bright Hub. Retrieved August 2, 2009, from http://www.brighthub.com/office/project-management/articles/13681.aspx.
 (2007, May). Lotus Advisor Editors' Choice Awards 2007. IBM Lotus Advisor. Retrieved January 16, 2008, from https://web.archive.org/web/20080507192328/http://my.advisor.com/doc/18931.
 (2006, May). Lotus Advisor Editors' Choice Awards 2006. IBM Lotus Advisor. Retrieved January 16, 2008, from https://web.archive.org/web/20090428015658/http://my.advisor.com/doc/18957.
 Nelson, K. (2004, September 14). Bristol West Moves to PPM. Insurance & Technology Online. Retrieved January 16, 2008, from https://web.archive.org/web/20061019223414/http://www.insurancetech.com/news/showArticle.jhtml?articleID=47205294
 Bonasia, J. (2004, August 5). Managers Cautiously Using Employee 'Tracking' Software. Investor's Business Daily. Retrieved January 16, 2008, from http://www.accessmylibrary.com/coms2/summary_0286-8786107_ITM. 
 Pickett, P. (2004, September 3). Drilling Down to the Heart of the Task. ITWorld Canada. Retrieved January 16, 2008, from http://www.itworldcanada.com/Pages/Docbase/ViewArticle.aspx?ID=idgml-766b7948-6411-4980-bf50-db9be02f93e3. 
 (2002, December). Lotus Advisor Excellence Awards. IBM Lotus Advisor. Retrieved January 16, 2008, from https://web.archive.org/web/20080930170548/http://my.advisor.com/doc/11420.
 Lombardo, C. (2002, December). T&B Software: About Time- And More. Accounting Technology. Retrieved January 16, 2008, from http://www.accessmylibrary.com/coms2/summary_0286-26944159_ITM.
 Dauten, D. (2002, November 3). Going With the Flow Innovative Way to Grow. Chicago Tribune. Retrieved January 16, 2008, from https://pqasb.pqarchiver.com/chicagotribune/access/230358361.html?dids=230358361:230358361&FMT=ABS&FMTS=ABS:FT.
 George, T. (2002, June 10). DuPont Plays the Match Game. InformationWeek. Retrieved January 16, 2008, from http://www.informationweek.com/news/showArticle.jhtml?articleID=6504515.
 Fox, P. (2002, April 22). Tapping the Right Tools. ComputerWorld.com. Retrieved January 16, 2008, from https://web.archive.org/web/20070302144543/http://www.computerworld.com/action/article.do?command=viewArticleBasic.
 (2002, February). Sanyo Succeeds with Automation Centre's Personnel Tracker. EproMag.com.
 Moore, C. (2002, January 30). Lotusphere Showcases Messaging, Collaboration Software. InfoWorld. Retrieved January 16, 2008, from https://web.archive.org/web/20080121101838/http://www.infoworld.com/articles/hn/xml/02/01/30/020130hnlotuswrap.html
 Sullivan, Laurie. (2002, January 15). Pioneer-Standard Invests in Collaborative Software. EBN.com. Retrieved January 16, 2008, from http://www.alacrastore.com/storecontent/bni/25105125.
 Tillet, S. (2002, January 7). Project Mgm't Automated. Internet Week. Retrieved January 16, 2008, from HighBeam.
 Sanborn, S. and Moore, C. (2001, December 7). Collaboration Comes Together. InfoWorld. Retrieved January 16, 2008 from https://web.archive.org/web/20050223100842/http://www.infoworld.com/articles/fe/xml/01/12/10/011210fecollab.html.
 Moore, C. (2001, October 22). Collaboration Burrows Into Biz Apps. InfoWorld. Retrieved January 16, 2008 from https://web.archive.org/web/20050325171048/http://www.infoworld.com/articles/fe/xml/01/10/22/011022feedge.html

External links
 TrackerSuite.Net official site. TrackerSuite.Net Flash demonstrations.
 Outlook Project Management Software

Project management software